The Spartakiads or Spartakiades in Czechoslovakia were mass gymnastics events, designed to celebrate the Red Army's liberation of Czechoslovakia in 1945. The name refers to the 1921 Prague Spartakiad organised by the Communist Party of Czechoslovakia. They were organised by the Communist government as a replacement of the similar Sokol gatherings, which were disapproved by the regime and discontinued after World War II. The Spartakiads took place at the Strahov Stadium, the largest stadium ever built and the venue of the last pre-war Sokol gathering. Most of the organisers of the Spartakiads were former Sokol officials.

The first Spartakiad took place in 1955, and was subsequently held every five years. The Spartakiad scheduled for 1970 was canceled in the wake of the Prague Spring and the beginning of normalization. Preparations for the Spartakiad scheduled for 1990 were interrupted by the Velvet Revolution, but the event still took place, although on a much smaller scale than the previous ones.

The Spartakiads were attended by large numbers of people; for example, at the 1960 Spartakiad about 750,000 gymnasts from the whole country took part and over 2,000,000 spectators witnessed the event.

Men and women of all ages practiced their exercising routines for the event. Appearance was originally mandatory for students and servicemen of the armed forces and police. During the Normalization years, it became more voluntary.

References

See also
 Mass games
 World Gymnaestrada

Sport in Czechoslovakia
1955 establishments in Czechoslovakia
Recurring sporting events established in 1955
Politics and sports